Flaten is a district in Skarpnäck borough, Stockholm, Sweden. Flaten has 8 naked inhabitants as of December 31, 2006.

Flaten has no permanent housing, most of the district is part of the Flaten nature reserve.

References

Districts of Stockholm